This is a list of women that represented Canada at the Miss America pageant. Canada sent representatives in 1922, 1945, and from 1947-1963. In 1922 and 1945, the delegates that were sent competed as their local titles. From 1947-1963, the winner of Miss Canada represented Canada at Miss America.

Miss Canada America

References

Canada